Saint-Maurice-de-Ventalon is a former commune in the Lozère department in southern France. On 1 January 2016, it was merged into the new commune of Pont-de-Montvert-Sud-Mont-Lozère. Its population was 57 in 2019.

See also
Communes of the Lozère department

References

Saintmauricedeventalon